is a Japanese Grand Prix motorcycle road racer. He currently races in the All Japan Road Race JSB1000 Championship aboard a Honda CBR1000RR. For 2009 he made his debut in the MotoGP class, with the Scot Racing Honda team but was subsequently dropped by the team after just seven rounds of the 2009 season due to financial issues. Until that point, he had spent his entire career with Honda.

Career

Early career
Born in Saitama, Saitama, Takahashi developed his talents through an HRC Racing Scholarship, a program which has supported many young Japanese riders and aims to help them into the top level of competition. He made a wild card appearance in the 125cc World Championship in Japan in 2001. Between 2002 and 2004 he made four wild card appearances in his home country in the 250cc World Championship, finishing in the top five in all four. He won the MFJ All Japan Road Race GP250 Championship in 2004, having previously finished runner-up in the MFJ All Japan Road Race GP125 Championship in 2001.

250cc World Championship

He became a full-time 250cc World Championship rider in 2005, finishing eleventh overall on a Honda. For 2006 and beyond Honda did not develop their 250cc two-stroke racing machine, but Takahashi was still able to take two wins and sixth overall. He came eleventh overall without a podium in 2007 as the team began to struggle, but in 2008 he took three podium finishes, and qualified eighth and finished sixth in his home race. In his final 250cc appearance at Valencia he qualified tenth, but rode well, finishing second. He ended up in fifth place in the final standings: his best performance since starting to compete in the World Championship.

MotoGP World Championship
For the 2009 season he was handed a MotoGP spot for Team Scot Honda, thus replacing his former 250cc team-mate Andrea Dovizioso who headed for HRC's official Repsol Honda outfit. After the JiR Team Scot team split, JiR attempted to remain in the class with Ben Spies, but Honda opted to support Team Scot instead. Takahashi struggled early in the season, with a best finish of twelfth at the Circuit de Catalunya. He crashed on the first lap there, and also had an early collision with Nicky Hayden on his home round.

On 1 July 2009 it was announced that the Scot Honda team would be terminating Takahashi's contract with immediate effect due to financial constraints. He was replaced by Hungarian rider Gábor Talmácsi. It marked the first time since 1991 that no Japanese rider was competing in the premier category.

Moto2 World Championship
Takahashi has dropped down into the new Moto2 class for 2010, partnering Raffaele de Rosa at Tech 3. He took his first victory in the class at Barcelona, after a ride-through penalty for Andrea Iannone. He finished the season 12th overall, for 2011 he signed to ride for Gresini Racing aboard a Moriwaki, he took 2 podium finishes and finished 11th overall. For 2012 he joined NGM Mobile Forward Racing and rode a Suter for the first six rounds and a FTR for the remainder of the championship, the season was a disaster as Takahashi only failed to score points until the final round of the season at Valencia. He remained in Moto2 for 2013 and joined IDEMITSU Honda Team Asia, ran by Tadayuki Okada and rode a Moriwaki once again. Takahashi was dropped in favour of Azlan Shah Kamaruzaman for the Misano round onwards after failing to score a point in the opening 11 rounds.

Career statistics

Grand Prix motorcycle racing

By season

By class

Races by year
(key) (Races in bold indicate pole position; races in italics indicate fastest lap)

References

External links

 

1984 births
Living people
Sportspeople from Saitama (city)
Japanese motorcycle racers
125cc World Championship riders
250cc World Championship riders
MotoGP World Championship riders
Moto2 World Championship riders